Group Areas Act was the title of three acts of the Parliament of South Africa enacted under the apartheid government of South Africa. The acts assigned racial groups to different residential and business sections in urban areas in a system of urban apartheid. An effect of the law was to exclude people of color from living in the most developed areas, which were restricted to Whites (Sea Point, Claremont). It required many people of color to commute large distances from their homes to be able to work. The law led to people of color being forcibly removed for living in the "wrong" areas. The majority that was people of color, were given much smaller areas (e.g., Tongaat, Grassy Park) to live in than the white minority who owned most of the country. Pass Laws required people of color to carry pass books and later "reference books", similar to passports, to enter the "white" parts of the country.

The first Group Areas Act, the Group Areas Act, 1950 was promulgated on 7 July 1950, and it was implemented over a period of several years. It was amended by Parliament in 1952, 1955 (twice), 1956 and 1957. Later in 1957, it was repealed and re-enacted in consolidated form as the Group Areas Act, 1957, which was amended in 1961, 1962, and 1965. In 1966, that version was, in turn, repealed and re-enacted as the Group Areas Act, 1966, which was amended in 1969, 1972, 1974, 1975, 1977, 1978, 1979, 1982, and 1984. It was repealed, along with many other discriminatory laws, on 30 June 1991 by the Abolition of Racially Based Land Measures Act, 1991.

Background
After the 1948 general election, D.F. Malan's administration commenced its policy of apartheid that sought to segregate the races in South Africa. The government hoped to achieve this through "separate development" of the races and this entailed passing laws that would ensure a distinction on social, economic, political and, in the case of the Group Areas Act, geographical lines. The Group Areas Act may be regarded as an extension of the Asiatic Land Tenure Act, 1946. Nelson Mandela stated in his book, Long Walk to Freedom that "the Groups Areas Act was the foundation of residential apartheid. Under its regulations, each racial group could own land, occupy premises, and trade only in its own separate area. Indians could henceforth only live in Indian areas, Africans in African, Coloureds in Coloured. If whites wanted the land or houses of the other groups, they could simply declare that land a white area and take them".

Provisions
The Act empowered the Governor-General to declare certain geographical areas to be for the exclusive occupation of specific racial groups. In particular the statute identified three such racial groups: whites, coloureds, and natives. This authority was exercised on the advice of the Minister of the Interior and the Group Areas Board.

Once an area had been designated for sole occupation by certain racial groups, the proclamation would not become legally effective for at least one year. Once this time had expired, it became a criminal offence to remain in occupation of property in that area with the punishment potentially being a fine and two years' imprisonment.

The Act also applied to businesses with racial designation being applied on the basis of the individuals who held a controlling interest in the company.

Impact

The Act became an effective tool in the separate development of races in South Africa. It also granted the Minister of the Interior a mandate to forcibly remove non-whites from valuable pieces of land so that they could become white settlements.

One of the most famous uses of the Group Areas Act was the destruction of Sophiatown, a suburb of Johannesburg. On 9 February 1955, 2,000 policemen began removing residents to Meadowlands, Soweto and erected a new white-only area called Triomf (Victory).

See also 
Apartheid laws

References

External links 
 List of apartheid-era legislation
 Original copy of statute
 Cape Town's District Six Museum, which examines forced removals

Apartheid laws in South Africa
1950 in South African law
1957 in South African law
1966 in South African law